Luc DuBois (born 11 July 1962) is a Swiss sailor. He competed in the 470 event at the 1984 Summer Olympics.

References

External links
 

1962 births
Living people
Swiss male sailors (sport)
Olympic sailors of Switzerland
Sailors at the 1984 Summer Olympics – 470
Place of birth missing (living people)